Aardam is a former hamlet in the Dutch province of South Holland and is now incorporated into the town Ter Aar, part of the municipality Nieuwkoop.

References

Populated places in South Holland
Geography of Nieuwkoop